Stone the Crows is the debut album by Scottish rock band Stone the Crows.

Legacy
In a retrospective review for AllMusic, Peter Kurtz feels the album contains rock, blues, and soul elements, but despite confident guitar work and a spirited effort, these elements are not successfully melded together.

Track listing

Personnel
Stone the Crows
Colin Allen – drums, percussion
Maggie Bell – vocals
Jimmy Dewar – bass guitar, vocals
Les Harvey – acoustic, electric guitars
John McGinnis – organ, piano, keyboards

Additional personnel
Robin Black – engineering
Peter Grant – executive producer
Mark London - producer
Christopher Neil – engineering
Chris Welch – liner notes

References

1970 debut albums
Polydor Records albums
Stone the Crows albums